The Helsinki 69ers are an American football club from Helsinki, Finland. The club was formed in 1991, and its men's first team is currently playing in Vaahteraliiga, the top tier of American football in Finland.

History 
The Helsinki 69ers were formed in 1991. The team started in the lower divisions of Finnish American football and slowly made its way up to 1st Division. The 69ers played 10 seasons in the division, and in 2012, the 69ers won the 1st Division championship, the Spaghettibowl. 69ers won the final against Kouvola Indians with a score of 43–10. For the first time the 69ers had a chance to play in the Vaahteraliiga, the highest level in Finland. The team played its first Vaahteraliiga game in 2013 season against TAFT, losing 41–14.

The club shares their stadium, the Helsinki Velodrome, with two other football teams from Helsinki: the Helsinki Roosters and the Helsinki Wolverines.

Club Structure 
The 69ers men's first team played in Vaahteraliiga in the 2014 season and placed sixth after the regular season, missing the playoffs.

The youth section of the club was founded in 2005. 69ers have five boys' youth teams: U11, U13, U15, U17 and U19.

See also
 East City Giants
 Helsinki Roosters
 Helsinki Wolverines

References

External links 
 
Vaahteraliiga 

American football teams in Finland
Sports clubs in Helsinki
1991 establishments in Finland
American football teams established in 1991